Abdul Matin (15 February 1980) well known as Martin Khan is a Nepali Actor/Costume Designer from Kisangunj, Bihar, India. As an actor, he has started from the music video called Mero Saath sing by hit singer Nabin K Bhattrai in 2001. As a Costume Designer he started from Nepali Movie called Mero euta Sathi Chha in 2009. His debut movie was Facebook in the year of 2011 Directed by Suraj Subba “Nalbo”. His most successful movie was Kohinoor which is All-time blockbuster at Nepali Film Industry History. He has an executive chairman of Factory Outlet Pvt.Ltd (Pocket) and also Managing Director of New OOPSS Pink Girly Traders.

Music Video

Filmography

References

21st-century Nepalese male actors
1980 births
Living people
Nepalese male film actors
People from Kishanganj district